The Samburu are a Nilotic people of north-central Kenya. Samburu are semi-nomadic pastoralists who  herd mainly cattle but also keep sheep, goats and camels. The name they use for themselves is Lokop or Loikop, a term which may have a variety of meanings which Samburu themselves do not agree on. Many assert that it refers to them as "owners of the land" ("lo" refers to ownership, "nkop" is land) though others present a very different interpretation of the term. Samburu speak the Samburu dialect of the Maa language, which is a Nilotic language. The Maa language is also spoken by other 22 sub tribes of the Maa community otherwise known as  the Maasai. Many Western anthropologists tried to carve out and create the Samburu tribe as a community of its own, unaffiliated to its parent Maasai community, a narrative that seems that many Samburu people today hold. There are many game parks in the area, one of the most well known is Samburu National Reserve. The Samburu sub tribe is the third largest in the Maa community of Kenya and Tanzania, after the Kisonko (Isikirari) of Tanzania and Purko of Kenya and Tanzania.

History 
Woto (sometimes Otto, *Do, To and Do) is a location which Samburu consider to be their homeland. Woto means north in Samburu. The exact location is unknown. It has generally been identified as being north of Lake Turkana and has been postulated to be somewhere in southern Ethiopia.

Cultural connections 
The Nandi have a tradition that the first man who practiced circumcision in Nandi is said to have been one Kipkenyo who came from a country called Do (in other accounts To, indicating the intervocalic Kalenjin *d sound – closest pronunciation Tto).

This corresponds with linguistic studies which indicate significant cultural transfer between Southern Nilotes and Eastern Cushites during a time of intensive interaction prior to Southern Nilotic settlement in western Kenya.

Culture

Social organization
The Samburu are a gerontocracy. The power of elders is linked to the belief in their curse, underpinning their monopoly over arranging marriages and taking on further wives. This is at the expense of unmarried younger men, whose development up to the age of thirty is in a state of social suspension, prolonging their adolescent status.

Clothing

Men wear a cloth which is often pink or black and is wrapped around their waist in a manner similar to a Scottish kilt. They adorn themselves with necklaces, bracelets and anklets, like other sub tribes of the Maasai community. Members of the moran age grade (i.e. "warriors") typically wear their hair in long braids, which they shave off when they become elders. It may be colored using red ochre. Their bodies are sometimes decorated with ochre, as well. Women wear two pieces of blue or purple cloth, one piece wrapped around the waist, the second wrapped over the chest. Women keep their hair shaved and wear numerous necklaces and bracelets. In the past decade, traditional clothing styles have changed. Some men may wear the 1980s-90s style of red tartan cloth or they may wear a dark green/blue plaid cloth around their waists called 'kikoi', often with shorts underneath. Marani (Lmuran) (warriors) wear a cloth that may be floral or pastel. Some women still wear two pieces of blue or red cloth, but it has become fashionable to wear cloths with animal or floral patterns in deep colors. Women may also often wear small tank tops with their cloths, and plaid skirts have also become common.

Food and society

Traditionally Samburu relied almost solely on their herds, although trade with their neighbors and use of wild foods were also important. Before the colonial period, cow, goat, and sheep milk was the daily staple. Oral and documentary evidence suggests that small stock were significant to the diet and economy at least from the eighteenth century forward. In the twenty-first century, cattle and small stock continue to be essential to the Samburu economy and social system.  Milk is still a valued part of Samburu contemporary diet when available, and may be drunk either fresh, or fermented; "ripened" milk is often considered superior. Meat from cattle is eaten mainly on ceremonial occasions, or when a cow happens to die. Meat from small stock is eaten more commonly, though still not on a regular basis. Today Samburu rely increasingly on purchased agricultural products—with money acquired mainly from livestock sales—and most commonly maize meal is made into a porridge. Tea is also very common, taken with large quantities of sugar and (when possible) much milk, and is a staple of contemporary Samburu diet. Blood is both taken from living animals, and collected from slaughtered ones. There are at least thirteen ways that blood can be prepared, and may form a whole meal. Some Samburu these days have turned to agriculture, with varying results.

Circumcision and genital mutilation 
Samburu practice male circumsision (foreskin) and female genital mutilation (clitoris). FGM is illegal in Kenya. Boys get circumcised in their teenage years, most girls are subjected to mutilation before marriage. Girls who have not undergone female genital mutilation will be raped as part of a practice referred to as "beading", and are not allowed to have children.

Religion 
Samburu religion traditionally focuses on their multi-faceted divinity (Nkai). Nkai (a feminine noun), plays an active role in the lives of contemporary Samburu. It is not uncommon for children and young people, especially women, to report visions of Nkai. Some of these children prophesy for some period of time and a few gain a reputation for prophecy throughout their lives. Besides these spontaneous prophets, Samburu have ritual diviners, or shamans, called 'loibonok' who divine the causes of individual illnesses and misfortune, and guide warriors.

Samburu believe that Nkai is the source of all protection from the hazards of their existence. But Nkai also inflicts punishment if an elder curses a junior for some show of disrespect. The elder’s anger is seen as an appeal to Nkai, and it is Nkai who decides if the curse is justified. Faced with misfortune and following some show of disrespect towards an older man, the victim should approach his senior and offer reparation in return for his blessing. This calms the elder's anger and restores Nkai’s protection. It is, however, uncommon for an elder to curse a junior. Curses are reserved for cases of extreme disrespect.

Many Samburu are Christian believers in Jesus Christ. Many of the Christian pastors in Samburu reside around the central town of Wamba. Many of the pastors in this area fluently speak English, Swahili, and Samburu. As the pastors walk out from the town to the “manyattas” (this refers to their small huts and the circular thorn boundaries that surround them), there they visit the churches they have planted among the people. When asked when they have church services, they simply reply, “When the pastor comes out, we have worship.”

In Western popular culture
Samburu have been widely portrayed in popular culture, ranging from Hollywood movies, major television commercials, and mainstream journalism. Such portrayals make good use of Samburu’s colorful cultural traditions, but sometimes at the expense of accuracy. One of the earlier film appearances by Samburu was in the 1953 John Ford classic Mogambo, in which they served as background for stars such as Clark Gable, Grace Kelly and Ava Gardner.

In the 1990s, 300 Samburu traveled to South Africa to play opposite Kevin Bacon in the basketball comedy The Air Up There, in which Samburu are portrayed as a group called “The Winabi” whose prince is a potential hoops star who would propel Bacon to a college head coaching job. Samburu extras were used to portray members of the closely related, but better known, Maasai ethnic group as in the film The Ghost and the Darkness, starring Michael Douglas and Val Kilmer. The 2005 film The White Masai—about a Swiss woman falling in love with a Samburu man—similarly conflates the two ethnic groups, mainly because the authors and directors believed that no one would have heard of Samburu. 

Dancing Samburu were included in a MasterCard commercial. Samburu runners were famously portrayed in a late 1980s Nike commercial, in which a Samburu man's words were translated into English as the Nike slogan “Just Do It.” This was corrected by anthropologist Lee Cronk, who seeing the commercial alerted Nike and the media that the Samburu man was saying “I don’t want these. Give me big shoes.” Nike, in explaining the error, admitted to having improvised the dialogue and stated “we thought nobody in America would know what he said." 

A tribe in season 3 of the U.S. reality television series Survivor, which was filmed in Kenya in 2001, was named Samburu.

Recent conflicts 
In a 2009 article MSNBC took readers on a tour through places purported to be in Samburu County, while asserting that conflicts between Samburu and the neighboring Pokot people was the result of both sides starving because they had more cattle than the rangelands could support.

Armed conflict between the Samburu and Pokot tribes has escalated since 2010 and it is almost entirely centered upon the declining pastures available for increasing cattle herd sizes, numbering now as many as 1,500 cattle in a single herd. With the recurrent droughts since 2010, and catastrophic drought of 2017, the battles for pasture have led to both sides invading the nature conservancies of Laikipia County. The armed conflict is incited by politicians on all sides who use it as a means to improve their credentials among pastoralist communities.

See also

 Natural Justice: Lawyers for Communities and the Environment (South Africa)
Samburu Project

References

Additional reading 

 Nigel Pavitt, "Samburu",

External links

 PEOPLE OF AFRICA

Ethnic groups in Kenya
African nomads
Nilotic peoples